Haibat Shahid railway station is located in  Pakistan.

See also
 List of railway stations in Pakistan
 Pakistan Railways

References

Railway stations in Kashmore District
Railway stations on Kotri–Attock Railway Line (ML 2)